Israel Beer Breweries Ltd (IBBL) is a brewery founded in 1992 in Ashkelon, Israel.

History
The company was founded in 1992. In 2004, IBBL was ranked the second largest company in Israel's beer and cider market, behind Tempo Beer Industries. On 2008-07-23, Carlsberg announced it sold its share of IBBL stock to CBC Group.

There are approximately 320 employees.

The brewery is located above an underground aquifer and uses its water in the production process.

The brewery is now part of the IBBL visitors center, in which visitors tour the brewery and the Carlsberg factory.

IBBL produces Carlsberg Beer and Tuborg Beer. In addition to beer, the company produces "Malty", a non-alcoholic beverage, as well as the "Prigat" brand juice-based drinks and nectars.

See also
Beer in Israel
Israeli cuisine
Israeli wine
Economy of Israel

References

Beer in Israel
Drink companies of Israel
Food and drink companies established in 1992
Israeli companies established in 1992